Natalya Anisimova may refer to:

 Natalya Anisimova (sprinter) (born 1973), Russian athlete who competed mainly in the 100 metres
 Natalya Anisimova (handballer) (born 1960), Russian handball player